Buena Vista is an unincorporated community located in Mora County, New Mexico, United States. Buena Vista has a post office with ZIP code 87712.

References

Unincorporated communities in Mora County, New Mexico
Unincorporated communities in New Mexico